Sharar may refer to:
 Sharar (biblical figure)
 Sharar, Maronite Anaphora
 Anaphora, attributed to St. Peter 
 Sharar, Iran, a city in Chaharmahal and Bakhtiari Province, Iran
 Abdul Halim Sharar, an Indian writer (1860–1926)
 Shanda Sharar (1979-1992), an American girl who was tortured and burned to death in Madison, Indiana, by four teenage girls.